Bevagna is a town and comune in the central part of the Italian province of Perugia (Umbria), in the flood plain of the Topino river.

It has a population of c. 5,000, with the town of Bevagna proper accounting for about half of that.

History
The city was originally an Etrusco-Oscan settlement. Around 80-90 BC it became a Roman municipium, called Mevania, in the Augustan Regio VI. It is mentioned on several ancient itineraries, following the Vicus Martis Tudertium on the way out of Rome.

In 310 BC the consul Fabius broke the Umbrian forces here; but otherwise it is not mentioned until the 1st century AD. In 69 the army of Vitellius awaited here the advance of Vespasian.

Pastures near the Tinia river and the white oxen of the Clitumnus River (the modern Clitunno) are mentioned by Propertius, whose family was from the area (from Assisium, Hispellum, or Mevania itself): they may refer to Mevania. Mevania is specifically mentioned by the later writers Silius Italicus, Lucan and Statius.

There are important remains of a temple near the north gate, of a theatre built into modern houses in the (misnamed) via dell'Anfiteatro, lesser remains of a second temple in the church of San Vincenzo near the east gate, mosaics belonging to midsized baths in the via Porta Guelfa, and very scanty remains of an amphitheatre at some distance from the modern town. The original walls, which have disappeared, were, according to Pliny (Hist. Nat. xxxv.173), built of unbaked bricks. The town now has a complete circuit of medieval stone walls that are said to be very near, if not identical with, the Roman walls.

After the Lombard conquest, it became the seat of a gastald in the Duchy of Spoleto, and after the year 1000 it was a free comune. In 1152 Frederick Barbarossa set it on fire. In 1249 it was again destroyed by the Count of Aquino. The Trinci family ruled it from 1371 to 1439. Later it was part of the Papal States until the unification of Italy.

Francis of Assisi and the birds
The legendary account of Francis of Assisi preaching to the birds took place in a field outside Bevagna. The stone on which he allegedly stood when preaching to the birds is now in the Ciccoli Chapel of the Church of San Francesco.

Main sights
Palazzo dei Consoli, known from 1187, with Teatro F. Torti (1886)
Romanesque church of S. Michele Arcangelo (12th-13th centuries)
Romanesque church of S. Silvestro (1195).
Church of Sant'Agostino (1316).
Church of San Francesco (after 1275)
Church of San Nicolò.
Church of Santa Maria in Laurenzia, built in the 13th century and later enlarged.
Church of San Vincenzo (known from the 12th century).
The medieval walls.
Ruins of a Roman temple.
Ruins of a Roman theatre.
Roman thermae with mosaics of marine life.
Castle of Cantalupo.
Castle of Castelbuono.
Church of Limigiano.
Castle of Torre del Colle.

Culture
The main events held in Bevagna include:
Primavera medievale (April): exposition of local culinary and artistic products held by the Associazione Mercato delle Gaitte.
Arte in Tavola (end of April): Spring festival with exhibitions by local artists, concerts, exhibitions of local products and dishes with tastings.
Mercato delle Gaite (June): big summer festival with medieval banquets, processions, challenges between the four gaite (quarters – those of San Giorgio, San Giovanni, San Pietro, and Santa Maria) and taverns.

Notable residents
 The painter Andrea Camassei (1602–1649) was born in Bevagna.
 The singer and composer Odoardo Ceccarelli (c. 1600–1668) was born in Bevagna.

References

External links

Official website
Pro Loco Bevagna
Bevagna.Net
Mercato del Gaite - all about the festivals (in Italian)
Mercato del Gaite English Video

Mevania at LacusCurtius

Roman sites of Umbria
Roman towns and cities in Italy